Law Chun Ting (born 11 January 1996) is a Hong Kong professional footballer who currently plays for Hong Kong Premier League club Tai Po.

Club career
In 2011, Law won a scholarship to study at BSix Sixth Form College, following in the footsteps of Tan Chun Lok and Leung Nok Hang. In October 2015, Law returned to Hong Kong to sign his first professional contract with Hong Kong Premier League club Yuen Long.

On 17 October 2020, Law was confirmed as a Pegasus player.

On 8 August 2022, Law joined Tai Po.

International career
On 15 July 2016, Law was named to the Hong Kong U-21 preliminary squad for a tournament in Singapore.

In July 2017, he was selected for the Hong Kong U-23 for the 2018 AFC U-23 Championship qualification tournament in North Korea. He made his debut for the Hong Kong B squad in October 2017 for the Interport Cup against Macau, earning praise from his future Yuen Long manager Kowk Kar Lok.

In October 2018, Law was called up to the senior Hong Kong squad by Gary White for a friendly against Indonesia but was an unused substitute.

Honours
Yuen Long
Hong Kong Senior Shield: 2017–18

References

External links
Law Chun Ting at HKFA

1996 births
Living people
Hong Kong footballers
Hong Kong Premier League players
Hong Kong First Division League players
Yuen Long FC players
TSW Pegasus FC players
Tai Po FC players
Association football defenders